Rüsselsheim Opelwerk station is a railway station in the Opelwerk district in the municipality of Rüsselsheim am Main, located in the Groß-Gerau district in Hesse, Germany.

References

Rhine-Main S-Bahn stations
Railway stations in Hesse
Buildings and structures in Groß-Gerau (district)
Railway stations in Germany opened in 1978
1978 establishments in West Germany
Opel